General Sir Arthur Power Palmer,  (25 June 1840 – 28 February 1904) was Commander-in-Chief, India between March 1900 and December 1902.

Military career
Power Palmer was born in June 1840, at Karnaul (Karnal), India, the son of Nicholas Palmer and Rebecca Carter Barrett. Educated at Cheltenham College, he was commissioned into the 5th Bengal Light Infantry in 1857. He took part in subduing the Indian Mutiny in 1857.

In 1880, he was appointed Assistant Adjutant-General in Bengal and in 1885 was Commander of the 9th Bengal Cavalry for the Suakin Expedition. In 1897 he took part in the Tirah Campaign. He was also General Officer Commanding 2nd Division during the action at Chagru Kotal.

In January 1898, he became Commander-in-Chief Punjab Command, and on 19 March 1900 he became Commander-in-Chief, India after the sudden death of Sir William Lockhart, holding this post for two and a half years.

In a farewell dinner held at Simla in late October 1902, the Viceroy, Lord Curzon said the following about their relationship:

Palmer returned to the United Kingdom in December 1902, and retired from the Army. He died in London in 1904 and is buried at Brompton Cemetery.

Honours
 KCB: Knight Commander of the Order of the Bath
 GCB: Knight Grand Cross of the Order of the Bath
 GCIE: Knight Grand Commander of the Order of the Indian Empire - 9 November 1901 - King's birthday Honours

Family
In 1867 he married Julia Helen Aylmer née Harris (1848–1896) who died in October 1896 and is buried at the Old Christian Cemetery, Abbottabad, Pakistan. they had a daughter Norah Blanche Aylmer née Palmer (1872–?) who married Major Gerard Beechey Howard Rice (1865–?); then in 1898 he married Constance Gabrielle Richardson née Shaw (1864–1912), widow of Walter Milton Roberts. He went on to have two more daughters with Constance: Celia de Courcy née Power-Palmer (1902–1973) and Frances Gabrielle née Power-Palmer (c1903–1987).

Further reading 
 Who Was Who 1897–1916 p545
 Oxford Dictionary of national Biography pp475–6

References

External links 
 

1840 births
1904 deaths
People educated at Cheltenham College
Knights Grand Cross of the Order of the Bath
Knights Grand Commander of the Order of the Indian Empire
British Commanders-in-Chief of India
British military personnel of the Indian Rebellion of 1857
British military personnel of the Tirah campaign
British Indian Army generals
Burials at Brompton Cemetery
British military personnel of the Abyssinian War
British military personnel of the Mahdist War
British military personnel of the Second Anglo-Afghan War
Members of the Council of the Governor General of India